Norma Frances "Tootsie" Tomanetz (born April 21, 1935) is an American barbecue cook who is the pitmaster at Snow's BBQ in Lexington, Texas. In 2008, she rose to fame when Texas Monthly named Snow's as the best barbecue place in Texas and she is often referred to as the "Queen of Texas BBQ." She is featured in the first episode of the seventh season of Chef's Table, titled Chef's Table: BBQ, which aired on September 2, 2020. Tomanetz lives in Giddings, Texas, and works during the week at Giddings High School as a janitor as Snow's BBQ is open only on Saturday.

She married Edward "White" Tomanetz in July 1956. They had three children, Patricia, Dale, and Hershey. In 1966, at the age of 31, she joined White at City Meat Market in Giddings to help out. She started managing the pit there and ran the place for many years. She and her husband eventually bought the City Meat Market, which she managed six days a week. In 1996, when White suffered a stroke, she was forced to sell the Market and for several years thereafter focused on caring for her husband until he recovered enough to regain some independence. White died in 2015, and Hershey died of a brain tumor the next year.

She joined the maintenance department at the high school in 1998, and then went to work with Kerry Bexley and helped him to open Snow's BBQ on March 2, 2003. In 2020, at the age of 85, she was still head chef at Snow's, waking up at 1 am on Saturday mornings to get ready for the Saturday rush. She continues to use old BBQ techniques including cooking meat above a bed of hot coals and using a mop sauce.

Recognition 
Tomanetz is a two-time James Beard Award semifinalist and she was inducted into the Barbecue Hall of Fame in 2018.

References 

American women chefs
Chefs from Texas
Living people
1935 births
Barbecue chefs
People from Lee County, Texas
People from Giddings, Texas
Janitors
21st-century American women
20th-century American women